The World Recreational Scuba Training Council (WRSTC) was founded in 1999 and is dedicated to creating minimum recreational diving training standards for the various scuba diving certification agencies across the world. The WRSTC restricts its membership to national or regional councils. These councils consist of individual training organizations who collectively represent at least 50% of the annual diver certifications in the member council's country or region. A national council is referred to as a RSTC (Recreational Scuba Training Council).

Significant training organisations which are not associated with WRSTC via membership of its regional RSTCs include Confédération Mondiale des Activités Subaquatiques (CMAS).

Member Councils

United States RSTC
On the basis of the experience of past attempts  within the United States (US) to control various aspects of recreational diving activity by legislation, the US RSTC was created in 1986 as a permanent body to sustain a relationship between various recreational diving training organisations.  In 1991, it replaced the Diving Equipment Manufacturers Association (DEMA) (renamed as the Diving Equipment and Marketing Association in 1998) as the secretariat for the then American National Standards Institute (ANSI) committee for Underwater Safety (also known as the Z86 Committee). The Z86 committee was subsequently replaced by the committee for Diving Instructional Standards and Safety (also known as the Z375 committee).  In 2007 it retained its appointment as the ANSI Accredited Standards Developer (ASD) for the Z375 committee.

The US RSTC has been responsible for the development of a standard medical statement (in conjunction with the Undersea and Hyperbaric Medical Society) and minimum training standards for diving hand signals and the following recreational diver grades - Introductory Scuba Experience, Supervised Diver, Open Water Diver, Enriched Air Nitrox Certification, Entry level Rescue Diver, Dive Supervisor, Assistant Instructor, Scuba Instructor and Scuba Instructor Trainer.

In 2020 the revised 'RSTC Medical Declaration Form' and 'Notes for Physicians' (diving medical guidance) were published, following a three-year review by the 'Diver Medical Screen Committee'.   (DMSC) comprises a team of internationally respected diving medicine experts; Dr Nick Bird, Dr Oliver Firth, (the late) Professor Tony Frew, Dr Alessandro Marroni, Professor Simon Mitchell, Associate Professor Neal Pollock and Dr Adel Taher.  

Membership of a US RSTC council member is one of the recognition criteria used by Boy Scouts of America (BSA) for the selection of recreational scuba diving instructors for the training of its members in order to receive the BSA Scuba Diving merit badge.

As of 2020, the following agencies are members:
 IANTD - International Association of Nitrox and Technical Divers
NAUI - National Association of Underwater Instructors
 PADI - Professional Association of Diving Instructors
 PDIC - The Professional Diving Instructors Corporation
 SDI - Scuba Diving International
 SSI - Scuba Schools International
 SNSI - Scuba and Nitrox Safety International
 RAID – Rebreather Association of International Divers
 NASE – National Academy of SCUBA Educators

RSTC Canada
The following agencies are currently members: 
 ACUC Canada
 PADI Canada
 SDI North America

RSTC Europe
RSTC Europe currently is a member of the European Underwater Federation.  The following agencies are currently members:   

 ACUC International
  Divers Alert Network Europe
 International Aquanautic Club (IAC)
 International Diving Association
 International Disabled Divers Association
 IDEA Europe
 National Association of Scuba Diving Schools Germany (NASDS)
 PADI EMEA
 Professional Diving Association
 Professional Scuba Schools
SDI Germany
 Scuba Nitrox Safety International
 SSI Europe
 Verband Internationaler Tauchschulen

RSTC Japan 
, the following agencies were members:  
 BSAC Japan
 National Association of Underwater Instructors
 PADI Japan
 SDI Japan
 SNSI Japan
 SSI Japan

References

External links
 WRSTC Official Site
 RSTC Europe website

Underwater diving training organizations
Supraorganizations